"Gypsy Woman (She's Homeless)" (also released as "Gypsy Woman (La da dee la da da)") is a song by American singer-songwriter Crystal Waters from her debut studio album, Surprise (1991). Written by Neal Conway and Waters, the song was released on April 3, 1991, as the lead single from the album. It is famous for its "la da dee, la dee da" refrain and its often-sampled keyboard riff, and is now widely regarded as one of the biggest classics of house music, being remixed several times since its release.

"Gypsy Woman" peaked at number eight on the US Billboard Hot 100 and topped the charts in Belgium, Italy, the Netherlands, Spain, Switzerland, as well as on the Eurochart Hot 100. The song also peaked within the top 10 of the charts in at least eight countries, including Germany, Ireland, and the United Kingdom, and entered the top 20 in Australia and France. In 2020, Slant Magazine ranked "Gypsy Woman" number 10 in their list of "The 100 Best Dance Songs of All Time". And in 2022, Pitchfork and Rolling Stones featured it in their list of "The 250 Best Songs of the 1990s" and "200 Greatest Dance Songs of All Time".

Background
Crystal Waters grew up in a very musical family. Her great aunt, Ethel Waters, was a famous singer and actor in the 1940s. Waters' father was a jazz musician and her uncle was the lead saxophonist with MFSB. At age eleven, she began writing poetry and was inducted into the Poetry Society of America when she was 14, the youngest person ever to receive that honor.

After studying business and computer science at university, she worked for the Washington, D.C. government, in the computer division, issuing arrest warrants. A workmate's cousin owned a recording studio and Waters found out that it was looking for backup singers. She went to the studio, got a job, and became a writer and backup singer. At a conference in Washington, D.C., she met the house-music production team Basement Boys. They wanted her to write some house songs for them while keeping her jazz influences. Thomas Davis from the Basement Boys told in a 1991 interview, "It was a great combination of influences. Crystal brings a background of jazz and blues to her music, which blended well with our various ideas." The first two songs she wrote were "Makin' Happy" and "Gypsy Woman".

Writing and release
"Gypsy Woman" was written by Waters with Neal Conway and was originally written for the American singer Ultra Naté, but when Waters recorded a demo herself, the production company drew up a recording contract for her on the spot and never passed the song to its intended vocalist. The song is about a homeless woman who wears make-up and thinks of herself as beautiful despite busking on a street corner. The song includes the chorus of "La da dee, la da da" and a much-sampled organ refrain. It was released as the first single from her 1991 debut album, Surprise.

Waters began working on the song after receiving beats from her producers she was supposed to write lyrics over. It was the song's heavy bass line that inspired her to riff "la da dee la da da" overtop of the rhythm, but she had trouble coming up with lyrics to match those short syllables. "I said to myself there must be someone singing it, and I thought of this woman ... she used to stand downtown on the corners, and she was dressed in all black," she told the Glitterbox Radio Show in 2017.

In a 2016 interview, Waters expanded on the story behind the lyrics for the song:

Even though the sound was a huge dance hit, Crystal Waters wanted people to listen to the lyrics about homelessness. She actually was upset that they weren't listening to the lyrics. At her prompting, the record company put a label with the addition of "She's Homeless" on the cover.

A year after its release, a new version turned up on the Red Hot Organization's Red Hot + Dance AIDS fundraiser disc (1992, distributed by Sony Music), gaining its remixer, Joey Negro, his first real American exposure.

Chart performance
"Gypsy Woman" peaked at number eight on the US Billboard Hot 100 and went to number one on the Billboard Hot Dance Music/Club Play chart. It also earned Waters three American Music Award nominations. In the United Kingdom, "Gypsy Woman" debuted at number three on the UK Singles Chart on May 12, 1991 – for the week ending date May 18, 1991. The following week, the song peaked at number two on the chart, becoming Waters' highest-charting song in Britain. It also soared to the number one position on the UK Dance Singles Chart. Retitled "Gypsy Woman (La Da Dee)", the song was the highest-debuting single for a new act on the UK Singles Chart at that time. Its debut at number three on the chart was later eclipsed by Gabrielle's "Dreams" entering at number two in June 1993, then by Whigfield's "Saturday Night" debuting at the top of the chart in September 1994.

In the rest of Europe, "Gypsy Woman" peaked at number one also in Belgium, Italy, the Netherlands, Spain and Switzerland. And it peaked within the top 10 of the charts in Austria (3), Denmark (6), Finland (3), Germany (2), Ireland (3), Portugal (2) and Sweden (8). 

"Gypsy Woman" was awarded with a gold record in the United Kingdom for 400,000 singles sold and in the United States after 500,000 units were sold. When the song was coming down in the chart rankings, it appeared on the benefit album Red Hot + Dance in a new incarnation mixed by Joey Negro, who took the song into a new musical direction.

Critical reception
"Gypsy Woman" received favorable reviews from most music critics. David Taylor-Wilson from Bay Area Reporter felt that it "will undoubtedly go down as the quintessential song of the summer." Larry Flick from Billboard remarked that the "inspired deep house dish" has already begun to explode at club level, "thanks to Waters' unique vocal and a hypnotic hook and groove crafted by hot production team the Basement Boys. Expect extensive radio action [in] several formats momentarily." He also declared it as "pure musical magic." A reviewer from Cashbox stated that by the time the single reached record stores, "it was already a big hit." Marisa Fox from Entertainment Weekly constated, "You just can't escape this summer's runaway hit song, the jazz-house hybrid 'Gypsy Woman' [...]. She hums in an airy, scat-like fashion about a woman 'who's just like you and me but she's homeless…and she stands there singing for money.'" Dave Sholin from the Gavin Report reported, "Exciting and totally fresh, this track broke out of the New York club scene and found its way onto HOT 97. APD/MD Kevin McCabe reports out of the fifty 12-inches he researches each week, it debuted at #3! Kevin says the response is across-the-board with teens requesting it, as well as women 30+ who call in Middays, asking for the song that goes, 'Dah dah dee dah dah dah.' It charts at #16, getting eight plays a day. Also debuted at #29 on KMEL and POWER 106 with adds at WTIC/FM, WIOQ/FM, and Z100 New York. 'Do I love it? YEAH!'" 

Lennox Herald viewed it as "a detailed account of the day-to-day life of a homeless woman in Washington, DC". Pan-European magazine Music & Media said "the "La Da Dee La Da Da" bit of this dance track is especially and undeniably catchy. Mainland Europe is next." Alan Jones from Music Week wrote that the "insidious" chorus "can be a little wearing after a while, but there's enough promise in the verses, both melodically and lyrically to suggest that Waters can be a bright new star." A reviewer from Reading Evening Post called it "infectious". James Hamilton from the RM Dance Update stated that "this Basement Boys produced strange haunting plaintive girl chanted and keyboards jabbed frisky Italo-type canterer has a madly catchy "la da dee, la de dah" chorus". David Fricke from Rolling Stone felt that the "deliciously nagging" chorus was "indisputably the Hook of the Year. The heartbeat propulsion and Morse-code keyboard line did the rest." He commented further, "A rather vapid lyric reduction of the sorrow and tragedy of homelessness [...] was nevertheless a rare bright spot of originality and blessed simplicity amid a '91-long plague of Identikit house records and overwrought remixes. [...] Still, for those fab few minutes of "Gypsy Woman" [...] Waters reigned as this year's Donna Summer." Scott Poulson-Bryant from Spin wrote that "with its nursery-rhymish hook and accessible cultural concern, this hypnotically danceable track has insinuated itself into the pop consciousness with an almost dreamy forcefulness".

Music video
The accompanying music video for "Gypsy Woman" was directed by American film director, writer, and producer Mark Pellington. It shows Waters performing in front of a white background. In most of the video, she wears a black suit, but some scenes also show her wearing a white suit. Three men in blue, green and red shirts are dancing. Occasionally a "gypsy woman", wearing a theater mask and gold gloves, can be seen holding a handheld mirror while putting on lipstick, dancing under a street light or lying on a park bench. Throughout the video, there are shots of rotating playhouses, falling banknotes, mannequin hands hanging in threads, and spinning umbrellas, some with the chorus written on them, making the words spin with them. A short glimpse of a burning dollhouse appears, and as Waters sings the last stanzas, the screen goes completely white again.

The music video uses the edited version of the Basement Boys "Strip To The Bone" mix. It was later published on Waters' official YouTube channel in October 2009, and had generated more than 68 million views as of January 2023.

Impact and legacy
AllMusic editor Alex Henderson wrote that it "made it clear that house music could be as socially aware as rap". He described it as a "wildly infectious treasure", noting further that it has a "poignant and moving reflection on a homeless woman's struggle that makes its point without preaching." In 2003, Irish Sunday World described it as "instantly catchy". Music critic of Spin, Jonathan Bernstein said in 1994, "So insidious, so remorseless a summer smash was Crystal Water's "Gypsy Woman" that several defense attorneys got their rooftop sniper clients off the hook by pointing to the subliminal qualities of the song's sinister la-da-dis." Slant Magazine ranked it 10th in its "100 Greatest Dance Songs" list in 2006, writing:

The Guardian mentioned it on their "A History of Modern Music: Dance" in 2011. Complex featured it in their "15 Songs That Gave Dance Music a Good Name" in 2013, describing it as "such a mixture of vibes" and "funky". BuzzFeed ranked it number 13 in their list of "The 101 Greatest Dance Songs of the '90s" in 2017. Stopera and Galindo said, "Problematic title. Great song. A classic." Tomorrowland included it in their official list of "The Ibiza 500" in 2020. Pitchfork featured it on their lists of "The 30 Best House Tracks of the ’90s" and "The 250 Best Songs of the 1990s" in 2022. Same year, Rolling Stones ranked it number 58 in their list of "200 Greatest Dance Songs of All Time".

Accolades

(*) indicates the list is unordered.

Track listings

 CD single
"Gypsy Woman (She's Homeless)" (Strip To The Bone Radio Edit) — 3:42
"Gypsy Woman (She's Homeless)" (Hump Instrumental Mix) – 4:53

 Slimcase international CD maxi
"Gypsy Woman (She's Homeless)" (Strip To The Bone Radio Edit) — 3:42
"Gypsy Woman (She's Homeless)" (Basement Boy "Strip To The Bone" Mix) – 7:26 
"Gypsy Woman (She's Homeless)" (Hump Instrumental Mix) – 4:53

 CD maxi single
"Gypsy Woman (She's Homeless)" (Strip To The Bone Radio Edit) – 3:42 	
"Gypsy Woman (She's Homeless)" (Basement Boy "Strip To The Bone" Mix) – 7:26 	
"Gypsy Woman (She's Homeless)" (Red Bone Club Mix) – 7:08 	
"Gypsy Woman (She's Homeless)" (Hump Instrumental Mix) – 4:53 	
"Gypsy Woman (She's Homeless)" ("Give It Up" Vocal Mix) – 8:07 	
"Gypsy Woman (She's Homeless)" (Give It Up Bonus Beats) – 2:43 	
"Gypsy Woman (She's Homeless)" (Original Demo Mix) – 7:00 	
"Gypsy Woman (She's Homeless)" (Acapella) – 2:37

Charts and certifications

Weekly charts

Year-end charts

Certifications

Release history

See also
 List of number-one dance singles of 1991 (U.S.)

References

1990 songs
1991 debut singles
Crystal Waters songs
Deep house songs
Dutch Top 40 number-one singles
European Hot 100 Singles number-one singles
Fictional Romani people
Mercury Records singles
Music videos directed by Mark Pellington
Music Week number-one dance singles
Number-one singles in Belgium
Number-one singles in Italy
Number-one singles in Spain
Number-one singles in Switzerland
Sam Sparro songs
Eleni Foureira songs